"No Idea" is a song by American rapper and singer Don Toliver. It was released by Cactus Jack Records, Atlantic Records, and We Run It Entertainment on May 29, 2019, as the lead single from Toliver's debut studio album, Heaven or Hell (2020). It was produced by WondaGurl and Cubeatz. The song gained popularity in December 2019 after going viral on video sharing app TikTok.

Background 
Don Toliver first gained prominence in 2018, after being featured on Travis Scott's Astroworld album, on the track "Can't Say". The song was later certified platinum and Toliver appeared as a supporting act on both legs of the Astroworld tour. He released his second mixtape Donny Womack (named after his alter-ego) the same month as the release of Astroworld, August 2018. He returned with "No Idea" in May 2019. The song gained popularity on the video-sharing app TikTok and rapidly started climbing charts thereafter. Toliver described the song as "the first chapter, the introduction, the real introduction to the chapter [of a new project]".

Composition
"No Idea" sees Don Toliver reference his alter-ego, Donny Womack (inspired by late R&B artist Bobby Womack). Heran Mamo of Billboard magazine described Toliver's vocals as "soulful, gaseous moans", noting the lyrics for containing "the roots of Southern rap". The song consists of a "dark, slinking beat", with Toliver delivering a "refreshing falsetto" during the chorus.

Toliver spoke to Complex about the concept of the song:

Critical reception
Frazier Tharpe of Complex magazine said the song is "everything you want from a Don Toliver song", complimenting the "earworm melodies" and Toliver's ability to showcase his growing talents as a writer. Nada Mesh of HotNewHipHop noted how the "dark trappy vibes of the beat" complement Toliver's rapping, described as "effortless flows".

Music video
The music video was also released on May 29, 2019, and directed by Grant Singer. Toliver described the theme of the video: "I'm basically going back down a memory lane type situation, and it kind of fast forwards to right now [2019]. When you listen to the song, and as you get deep into it, you start to figure out. I'm kind of ranting on what's going on right now, you know?"

TikTok dance 
Over 8 million videos have been made on TikTok using the song, with over 6 billion plays as of June 2020. Popular TikTok users like Charli D'Amelio, who was the most-followed individual on the platform at the time, helped to popularize the song on the platform. These videos usually consist of users dancing to a snippet of the song. It was the top TikTok song for December 2019.

Charts

Weekly charts

Year-end charts

Certifications

Release history

References

2019 singles
2019 songs
Atlantic Records singles
Songs written by WondaGurl
Songs written by Kevin Gomringer
Songs written by Tim Gomringer
Song recordings produced by Cubeatz
Songs written by Don Toliver
Don Toliver songs